The Office of Legal Counsel (OLC) is an office in the United States Department of Justice that assists the Attorney General's position as legal adviser to the President and all executive branch agencies. It drafts legal opinions of the Attorney General and provides its own written opinions and other advice in response to requests from the Counsel to the President, the various agencies of the Executive Branch, and other components of the Department of Justice. The Office reviews and comments on the constitutionality of pending legislation. The office reviews any executive orders and substantive proclamations for legality if the President proposes them. All proposed orders of the Attorney General and regulations that require the Attorney General’s approval are reviewed. It also performs a variety of special assignments referred by the Attorney General or the Deputy Attorney General.

History
The Office of Legal Counsel was created in 1934 by an act of US Congress, as part of a larger reorganization of executive branch administrative agencies. It was first headed by an assistant solicitor general. In 1951, Attorney General J. Howard McGrath made it a division led by an assistant attorney, and named it the Executive Adjudications Division. This name was changed to Office of Legal Counsel in an administrative order by Attorney General Herbert Brownell Jr., issued April 3, 1953.

Responsibilities
The Office of Legal Counsel (OLC) assists the Attorney General of the United States in their function as legal adviser to the President and all the executive branch agencies, hence the appellation "the president's law firm." OLC drafts legal opinions of the Attorney General and also provides its own written opinions and oral advice in response to requests from the Counsel to the President, the various agencies of the executive branch, and offices within the Department of Justice. Such requests typically deal with legal issues of particular complexity and importance or about which two or more agencies are in disagreement. The Office also is responsible for providing legal advice to the executive branch on all constitutional questions and reviewing pending legislation for constitutionality.

Usually all executive orders and proclamations proposed to be issued by the President are reviewed by OLC for form and legality, as are various other matters that require the President's formal approval.  In addition to serving as, in effect, outside counsel for the other agencies of the executive branch, OLC also functions as general counsel for the Department of Justice itself. It reviews all proposed orders of the Attorney General and all regulations requiring the Attorney General's approval.

According to press accounts, OLC has historically acted as a referee within the executive branch and its legal opinions have generally been given deference among the agencies and departments.

Controversies

George W. Bush administration 

During President George W. Bush's first term in office, OLC Deputy Assistant Attorney General John Yoo drafted, and Assistant Attorney General Jay S. Bybee signed, a set of legal memoranda that became known as the "torture memos." These memos advised the CIA and the Department of Defense that the President may lawfully authorize the torture of detainees (euphemistically referred to as "enhanced interrogation techniques"), including beating, binding in contorted stress positions, hooding, subjection to deafening noise, sleep disruption, sleep deprivation to the point of hallucination, deprivation of food, drink, and withholding medical care for wounds, as well as waterboarding, walling, sexual humiliation, subjection to extreme heat or extreme cold, and confinement in small, coffin-like boxes. The Justice Department's Office of Professional Responsibility (OPR) later concluded that Yoo committed "intentional professional misconduct" in advising the CIA that it could torture detainees and that by signing Yoo's memorandum, Bybee had "acted in reckless disregard of his obligation to provide thorough, objective, and candid legal advice."

In May 2005, during President George W. Bush's second term, a set of similar torture memos were approved by Steven G. Bradbury, who served as acting head of OLC from February 2005 through the remainder of President Bush's second term. Bradbury was first officially nominated on June 23, 2005, and then repeatedly re-nominated because of Senate inaction. His position became a point of political friction between the Republican President and the Democratic-controlled 110th Congress, when Democrats contended that Bradbury was in the position illegally, while Republicans argued that Democrats were using his nomination to score political points. An opinion issued by the Government Accountability Office concluded that his status was not a violation of the Federal Vacancies Reform Act of 1998.

Obama administration 
In the first two years of the Obama Administration, OLC at least twice reached an outcome with which Administration officials disagreed.  In June 2011, New York Times reporter Charlie Savage revealed that President Obama took the unusual step of overruling the Office of Legal Counsel's advice with respect to the legality of military action in Libya.  OLC's written opinions have historically been considered binding on the executive branch, unless they are overturned by the Attorney General or President.  In 2009, Attorney General Eric Holder overturned an unpublished OLC opinion that had concluded that a D.C. voting rights bill pending in Congress was unconstitutional.

Trump administration 

Early in the Trump administration, OLC approved Executive Order 13769 (referred to as the "travel ban" because it restricted entry from certain foreign countries which had Muslim-majority populations). Days later, Acting Attorney General Sally Yates announced that the Department of Justice would not defend the Order in court. Explaining her decision, Yates stated that OLC's review assessed only whether a "proposed Executive Order is lawful on its face and properly drafted," not outside evidence about the order's purposes or whether the policy of the order is "wise or just." Yates was fired later that day. Her successor as acting attorney general, Dana Boente, referenced OLC's analysis when he reversed her decision. The Executive Order was challenged in court, then superseded by subsequent Executive Orders and Presidential Proclamations.

In a United States Senate hearing, Yates was asked whether she was aware of any past instance of an attorney general rejecting an executive order that had been approved by OLC. Yates testified that she was not aware of that ever happening, but that she was also not aware of a situation in which OLC failed to tell the attorney general about an executive order before it was issued.

Barr letter

In March 2019, the Mueller investigation delivered its final report to Attorney General Bill Barr. Even before reading the report, Barr had already made the decision to clear Trump of obstruction of justice. Upon receiving the report, Barr tasked the OLC with preparing a memorandum that would pretextually justify Barr's decision, instead of providing candid counsel. This memorandum was written in tandem with the Barr letter over the course of two days; the final version was signed by Steven Engel and Ed O'Callaghan. The D.C. Circuit held that the memo was not shielded from disclosure by the deliberative process privilege, because then-Attorney General Barr had already determined, by the time the memo was written, that DOJ would not charge Trump with a crime, making the memo akin to a "thought experiment."

Whistleblower complaint

In September 2019, Engel authored an OLC opinion that the Justice Department should not forward the Trump–Ukraine scandal whistleblower complaint to Congress. In an October 2019 letter, 67 inspectors general from the Council of the Inspectors General on Integrity and Efficiency sharply criticized the Justice Department's decision to withhold the complaint from Congress, describing the memo as having a "chilling effect on effective oversight" and being "wrong as a matter of law and policy". The inspectors general recommended the OLC memo be withdrawn or amended because it "effectively overruled the determination by the ICIG regarding an 'urgent concern' complaint" that the ICIG concluded was "credible and therefore needed to be transmitted to Congress".

List of Assistant Attorneys General in charge of OLC 

Only one woman, Obama-appointee Virginia Seitz, has served as the confirmed head of OLC.

Current political appointees at the Office of Legal Counsel 
Current political appointees at the Office of Legal Counsel include:

 Christopher H. Schroeder, Assistant Attorney General
 Dawn Johnsen, Principal Deputy Assistant Attorney General
 Vacant, Deputy Assistant Attorney General
 Vacant, Deputy Assistant Attorney General
 Vacant, Deputy Assistant Attorney General

See also 

 White House Counsel

Further reading 

  See chapter 5.

References

External links

The Missing Memos Special Project ProPublica's tracking table of both released and yet to be released OLC memos.
Office of Legal Counsel Memos The ACLU's page dealing with the OLC memos.
 4 Torture Memos Released 16Apr2009 in response to FOIA suit by ACLU.
 Senate Armed Forces Committee Report on Torture Released 22Apr2009.

United States Department of Justice agencies
 
1934 establishments in the United States